The 2019 Women's Oceania Youth Handball Championship was held in New Caledonia from 11 to 16 August 2019.

The competition participants were host New Caledonia, Australia, New Zealand, French Polynesia, Papua New Guinea and Fiji.

Hosts New Caledonia were the winners over New Zealand. Third was French Polynesia then Australia. Fifth was Papua New Guinea ahead of Fiji on goal difference

Women's Results

Pool A

French Pacific Championship

Rankings

References

 Report Day 1 & 2.International Handball Federation webpage
 Results & Report on International Handball Federation webpage
 All games on You Tube - Nouvelle-Calédonie la 1ère (French)
 Grace Schulz to represent Australia under 18 women's handball team at Oceanic Cup. Redland City Bulletin. 23 July 2019
 International Handball Success. Brisbane State High School. 9 August 2019 

Oceania Women's Youth Handball Championship